Illya Olehovych Kvasha (born 5 March 1988) is a Ukrainian diver. Competing with Oleksiy Prygorov, he won the bronze medal in the 3 m spring synchro at the 2008 Summer Olympics in Beijing. Kvasha is also a multiple European champion both individual and synchronised.

Career
He also competed at the 2012 Summer Olympics, in both the individual and the synchro with Prygorov.  At the 2016 Olympics, he reached the final of the individual 3 m springboard.

He specializes in 1m and 3m springboard. He is twice silver medalist of the World Championships in 1m competition and once bronze medalist in 3m synchro event which was his greatest success in a synchro competition since Olympic bronze.

Kvasha is one of the most famous and popular modern Ukrainian athletes. He was also thrice awarded The Best Sportsman of the Month by the NOC of Ukraine: in March 2008, April 2009, and June 2017.

References

External links
Illya Kvasha's profile at ESPN Sports
Beijing 2008 Profile

1983 births
Living people
Olympic bronze medalists for Ukraine
Ukrainian male divers
Divers at the 2008 Summer Olympics
Divers at the 2012 Summer Olympics
Divers at the 2016 Summer Olympics
Olympic divers of Ukraine
Sportspeople from Mykolaiv
Olympic medalists in diving
Medalists at the 2008 Summer Olympics
World Aquatics Championships medalists in diving
Universiade medalists in diving
Universiade silver medalists for Ukraine
Universiade bronze medalists for Ukraine
Medalists at the 2009 Summer Universiade
Medalists at the 2011 Summer Universiade
20th-century Ukrainian people
21st-century Ukrainian people